NGC 7191 is a spiral galaxy registered in the New General Catalogue. It is located in the direction of the Indus constellation. It was discovered by the English astronomer John Herschel in 1835 using a 47.5 cm (18.7 inch) reflector. It is a member of the galaxy group known as the NGC 7192 group, named after its brightest member, NGC 7192. Other members of the group include NGC 7179, and NGC 7219.

See also 
 New General Catalogue

References

External links 

Intermediate spiral galaxies
Indus (constellation)
7191
68059
Astronomical objects discovered in 1835
Discoveries by John Herschel